The 1938 United States Senate elections in Indiana took place on November 8, 1938. Incumbent Democratic Senator Frederick Van Nuys was narrowly re-elected to a second term in office over Raymond E. Willis by a margin of 5,197 votes out of over 1.5 million cast.

General election

Candidates
Miles Blansett (Communist)
Louis E. Roebuck (Socialist)
Herman L. Seeger (Prohibition)
Frederick Van Nuys, incumbent Senator since 1933 (Democratic)
Raymond E. Willis, former State Representative (Republican)

Results

Aftermath 
On March 13, Willis petitioned the Senate for a review of the election, alleging tampering with tabulation machines and allowing improperly registered persons to vote. Willis also charged that recipients of Works Progress Administration jobs and relief were pressured to vote for the Democrats, and he complained about the infamous Two Per Cent Club, which was said to have violated the corrupt practices acts by collecting and disbursing thousands of dollars for the senatorial election without keeping appropriate records. He made no allegation that Van Nuys was involved or aware of corrupt practices.

After one month's investigation, the Senate Committee on Privileges and Elections returned a report favorable to Van Nuys, and it was carried by a voice vote of the whole Senate.

Willis was elected to Indiana's other Senate seat in 1940. Willis and Van Nuys were Senate colleagues for four years until the latter's death in 1944.

See also 
 1938 United States Senate elections

References

1938
Indiana
United States Senate